António Jorge Rocha Simão  (born 12 August 1976) is a Portuguese former footballer who played as a midfielder, currently a manager.

Having played only as an amateur, he began work as an assistant manager at 26, before his first outright position at Atlético in 2014. He led six Primeira Liga clubs, starting with Belenenses.

Football career
Born in Pampilhosa da Serra, Coimbra District, Simão played solely amateur football, emerging through C.F. Estrela da Amadora's youth system and retiring at the age of 26. He started working as a coach in 2003, going on to act as assistant at several clubs.

In February 2014, Simão left his assistant position at Primeira Liga club C.F. Os Belenenses and embarked on his first managerial role by accepting an invitation at Segunda Liga side Atlético Clube de Portugal until the end of the season. Despite claiming 16 points from a possible 36, he was unable to prevent his team from finishing bottom of the league, but they were later reinstated as the competition was expanded.

Subsequently, Simão joined C.D. Mafra from the third division. On 17 March 2015, however, he moved straight to the top tier at Belenenses, replacing Lito Vidigal at the sixth-placed club. His debut five days later was a 1–0 loss at Boavista F.C. and his nine-game spell divided equally between results, leaving the team's position unchanged and UEFA Europa League qualification confirmed.

In the 2015 off-season, Simão succeeded Paulo Fonseca at the helm of F.C. Paços de Ferreira. He left at the end of the campaign, after achieving a seventh-place finish.

Simão started 2016–17 also in the top tier, with G.D. Chaves. On 17 December 2016, he was appointed at fellow league club S.C. Braga as a replacement for fired José Peseiro. He resigned at the latter in late April 2017, due to poor results.

Simão returned to both active and the Portuguese top flight on 14 September 2017, replacing the fired Miguel Leal at the helm of Boavista. His first game in charge was two days later, and his team managed to defeat current champions S.L. Benfica 2–1 at home. On 26 January 2019, with the team one point above the relegation places, he left by mutual consent to be replaced by Vidigal.

In June that year, Simão's name was discussed by the board of EFL Championship club Middlesbrough for their vacant managerial position, but instead he took his first foreign job at Al-Fayha FC in the Saudi Professional League. In late August 2020, he was dismissed with three games remaining and one point above relegation.

On 14 May 2021, having been relegated with Royal Excel Mouscron of the Belgian First Division A, Simão returned to Paços de Ferreira. On 11 December, after eight matches without a win in all competitions and with the side placed 13th in the league, he left by mutual agreement.

Simão took over from the sacked Mário Silva at C.D. Santa Clara on 11 January 2023, signing a five-month contract. With two points from seven games, he was dismissed on 26 February.

Managerial statistics

References

External links

1976 births
Living people
People from Pampilhosa da Serra
Sportspeople from Coimbra District
Portuguese footballers
Association football midfielders
C.F. Estrela da Amadora players
Real S.C. players
Portuguese football managers
Primeira Liga managers
Liga Portugal 2 managers
Atlético Clube de Portugal managers
C.F. Os Belenenses managers
F.C. Paços de Ferreira managers
G.D. Chaves managers
S.C. Braga managers
Boavista F.C. managers
C.D. Santa Clara managers
Saudi Professional League managers
Al-Fayha FC managers
Belgian Pro League managers
Royal Excel Mouscron managers
Portuguese expatriate football managers
Expatriate football managers in Saudi Arabia
Expatriate football managers in Belgium
Portuguese expatriate sportspeople in Saudi Arabia
Portuguese expatriate sportspeople in Belgium